Pacaya is an active complex volcano in Guatemala, which first erupted approximately 23,000 years ago and has erupted at least 23 times since the Spanish conquest of Guatemala. After being dormant for over 70 years, it began erupting vigorously in 1961 and has been erupting frequently since then. Much of its activity is Strombolian, but occasional Plinian eruptions also occur, sometimes showering the area of the nearby Departments with ash.

Pacaya is a popular tourist attraction. It is even the home to the popular Guatemala Impact Marathon which pioneered the use of a running route across the lava field created by the 2010 eruption and supports the local communities through runners endeavouring to complete the challenge. It lies 30 kilometers (19 miles) southwest of Guatemala City and close to Antigua. The volcano sits inside the Escuintla Department. Volcano Boarding is also practiced on the craters of Pacaya.

Villagers near Pacaya ignored an evacuation request as the volcano threw ashes into the air in March 2021.

Geological history
The Pacaya volcano is a part of the Central American Volcanic Arc, a chain of volcanoes stretching from the northwest to the southeast along the Pacific coast of Central America, formed by the tectonic subduction of the Cocos Tectonic Plate beneath the Caribbean Plate. Pacaya lies on the southern edge of a sizable volcanic caldera formed in the Pleistocene age which contains Lago de Amatitlán.

After the last caldera-forming eruption 23,000 years ago, several smaller vents within and around the caldera have seen eruptive activity. Pacaya is the largest post-caldera volcano, and has been one of Central America's most active volcanoes over the last 500 years. It has erupted at least 23 times since the Spanish conquest, producing basalt and basaltic andesite.

About 1,100  years ago the volcano's edifice collapsed, causing a huge landslide. The landslide left a large crater, within which the current active cone has grown. The presence of a magma chamber at shallow depths beneath Pacaya means that distortion of the cone leading to instability and future landslides remains a hazard to the surrounding areas.

Recent eruptions

With its almost continuous activity, the volcano has been a popular location for tourism, and is easily accessible from Guatemala City and from Antigua. Pacaya and the surrounding area now lie within the Pacaya National Park, which was created to supervise and protect tourism in this region. The Pacaya Park generates its income from tour groups who are charged a small fee of 100 Quetzales to enter the park.

Ash fall affected nearby cities including Guatemala city and La Aurora International Airport.

During 2006, a slight increase in Pacaya's volcanic activity brought about the creation of several lava rivers that slowly flow down its slope. Word about these phenomena spread, and local tourism increased significantly.

May 2010 eruption

On May 27, 2010, the Pacaya volcano erupted, followed by several tremors. Ash rained down in many Guatemalan cities to the northwest of the volcano, including Guatemala City. The volcanic ash fall pelted Guatemala City, and the international airport, La Aurora. The National Coordinator for Disaster Reduction (CONRED) declared a red alert for the communities near the volcano and recommended the evacuation of some of them. Noti7 reporter Anibal Archila, one of the first to cover the event, was reportedly killed by volcanic debris.

President Álvaro Colom declared a state of calamity in the region adjacent to the volcano, and the Ministry of Education closed the schools in the departments of Guatemala, Escuintla, and Sacatepequez. Heavy rainfall from Tropical Storm Agatha worsened the emergency situation, causing lahars, landslides and widespread flooding across the country. However, people working in coffee fields considered the rain brought by the storm to be helpful, removing ash from their trees.

See also

 Central America Volcanic Arc

References

External links
 Pacaya images and information from VolcanoWorld
 BBC News article about an eruption in 2000
  Pacaya 1992 auf Vulkanfaszination''

Image gallery

Active volcanoes
Escuintla Department
Mountains of Guatemala
National parks of Guatemala
Complex volcanoes
Stratovolcanoes of Guatemala
Subduction volcanoes
Sierra Madre de Chiapas
Protected areas established in 1956